Harald Berglund (1904–1980) was a Swedish cinematographer.

Selected filmography
 The Women Around Larsson (1934)
 Close Relations (1935)
 Our Boy (1936)
 The Quartet That Split Up (1936)
 South of the Highway (1936)
 For Better, for Worse (1938)
 We at Solglantan (1939)
 Blossom Time (1940)
 A Sailor on Horseback (1940)
 Her Melody (1940)
 Sunny Sunberg (1941)
 How to Tame a Real Man (1941)
Lucky Young Lady (1941)
 Lasse-Maja (1941)
 The Case of Ingegerd Bremssen (1942)
 Sun Over Klara (1942)
 A Girl for Me (1943)
 Skipper Jansson (1944)
 Blizzard (1944)
 The Green Lift (1944)
 The People of Hemsö (1944)
 Tired Theodore (1945)
 Brita in the Merchant's House (1946)
The Key and the Ring (1947)
 The Loveliest Thing on Earth (1947)
 Each Heart Has Its Own Story (1948)

References

Bibliography 
 Peter Cowie. Swedish Cinema. Zwemmer, 1966.

External links 
 

1904 births
1980 deaths
People from Stockholm
Swedish cinematographers